Prem Nazir (born Abdul Khader; 7 April 1926 – 16 January 1989) was an Indian actor known as one of Malayalam cinema's definitive leading men of his generation. He is widely regarded as one of the most influential actors in the history of Indian cinema. A popular cultural icon of Kerala, Nazir is often referred to as Nithyaharitha Nayakan ("Evergreen Hero"). Nazir began his career as a stage actor and made his film debut with the 1952 film Marumakal. He took on the stage name Prem Nazir on the sets of his second film, Visappinte Vili (1952).

Nazir is noted for his performances in films such as Murappennu (1965), Udhyogastha (1967), Iruttinte Athmavu (1967), Kallichellamma (1969), Virunnukari (1969), Nadhi (1969), C.I.D. Nazir (1971), Anubhavangal Paalichakal (1971), Taxi Car (1972), Azhakulla Saleena (1973), Nellu (1974), Ariyappedatha Rahasyam (1981), Vida Parayum Munpe (1981), Padayottam (1982), and Dhwani (1988). Nazir won the Kerala State Film Award (Special Jury Award) for his role as Madhavan Kutty in Vida Parayum Munpe. The Government of India honoured him with the Padma Bhushan the third highest civilian honours respectively, for his contribution towards the arts. He died due to measles on 16 January 1989 at the age of 62.

Nazir holds the Guinness World Records for playing opposite the same heroine in 130 films (with Sheela), and previously held the record for playing the lead role in a record 720 films. He also holds two other acting records; for acting opposite eighty heroines and for acting in lead roles in 30 films which were released in a single year (1973 and 1977).

Early life

Nazir was born in Chirayinkeezhu in the princely state of Travancore (now in  Thiruvananthapuram district of Kerala), to Akkode Shahul Hamid and Asuma Beevi on 7 April 1927 in Rowther Family. He had two brothers - Prem Nawas (Abdul Wahab) - and Ashraf and six sisters - Sulekha, Arifa, Aneesa, Umaiba, Sunaisa and Suhara. His mother died when he was very young, and his father remarried a woman of the same name. He completed his formal education from Kadinamkulam Lower Primary School, Sri Chithiravilasam School, Trivandrum, SD College, Alappuzha, and St. Berchmans College, Changanassery. By the time he completed his education, he had become an experienced drama artist.

Career

Entry into cinema

Prem Nazir had his acting debut as Shylock in the play The Merchant of Venice (1951), when he was a student at SB College, Changanacherry. He won the best actor award for this role in the play directed by Sheppard. His first film was Marumakal (1952), directed by S. K. Chari and produced by Paul Kallungal. He was credited as Abdul Khader in this film. He got his career break with Visappinte Vili (1952), his second film, made for K&K Combines (Udaya Studio) by Telugu director Mohan Rao. It was on the set of this movie he was renamed to Prem Nazir by Thikkurussi Sukumaran Nair. Prem Nazir started his career when drama was the most popular visual medium and film making at its infancy. He began acting for the Excel Productions (Udaya Studio) and most of his films were for the Udaya and Merryland Studios.

1950s: Rise to stardom

With the arrival of Nazir, there was a new screen personality, a new debonair actor who could be a youth heart throb. Prem Nazir acquired the halo of a romantic hero and a loyal following. His tear-jerkers were very popular with female audiences and soon made him a darling of the masses. He became the first real star of Malayalam cinema. Another factor that assisted Prem Nazir's rise – as it had the rise of his contemporaries in other regional film industries – was the continuing reign of mythologicals and devotionals. Costumed musicals, filmed start-to-finish within the confines of a studio, contributed their own. All such films for a long period kept him before his fans, nourished his romantic image and provided him unlimited scope for rehearsing and refining his talent in playing diverse roles. Since the bulk of South Indian cinema was theatrical visually and aurally, Prem Nazir's stage background and his extraordinary command of Malayalam helped him win the hearts of his audience.

1960s, 1970s: Golden years

In the late 1950s, Nazir drew attention by playing movies with themes based on social and religious injustices in the society. From 1956 to 1976, Prem Nazir rode high at the crest of a tidal wave of popularity and also gave his best to Malayalam cinema. Nazir catapulted to the row of the finest actors of India with the film Iruttinte Athmavu (1967). Playing a demented youth – Velayadhan, Prem Nazir discovered his prowess as a dramatic actor of great intensity. Many critics have evaluated this role as his masterpiece, and as one of the finest onscreen performances ever. Written by M. T. Vasudevan Nair, the film provided Malayalam cinema with a new direction; that of the low-budget film. One could see a lot of the pre-occupations of the scenarist, who carried the touches of human relationships through all of his subsequent films whether as screenplay writer or director. In spite of its large number of studio shots and overall theatricality, the film was so culturally rich that many of the episodes would become archetypes for future Malayalam film makers dealing with family drama. It depicted the story of an imbecile (finely portrayed by Prem Nazir) in a joint family with remarkable sensitivity and seriousness of purpose.

During his peak time, Nazir gave life to many characters and enjoyed a wide popularity among all sects of the society. He acted in the first-ever investigative series in Malayalam cinema C.I.D. Nazir directed by P. Venu. He has played historical characters based on Vadakkan Pattukal. Aromalunni, Kannappanunni, Thacholi Ambu and Padayottam are some major films in this genre. Although the actor faced criticism for playing such roles as his physique was least suited for it, he still enjoyed a huge fan following among the audiences. He was well known for his roles as Hindu deities like Rama, Krishna and Ayyappa. In his movies, Nazir was well known for playing the eternal romantic hero and the good guy who would bash up the villains without remorse.

Even though Nazir could not regenerate after the mid-1970s, he maintained his superstardom till the beginning of the 1980s. In 1979, 39 of his films got released; a record. He also holds the record for having acted in the most leading roles – about 700 films (with 85 heroines; another record). Another record is for the most enduring screen team along with actress Sheela. They played opposite each other in 130 movies by 1975. Although Sheela is known as the lucky mascot of Prem Nazir, his movies with other heroines like Jayabharathi and Sharada were also big successes at box office. Prem Nazir pairing with comedian Adoor Bhasi was a sure-fire laugh riot. The void left by this duo is yet to be occupied. Nazir's association with playback singer K. J. Yesudas was perfect for the audience. Even today many consider the Nazir – Yesudas combination of song sequences remain the best ever on screen. He is quite popularly described as Nithyaharithanayakan (The Evergreen Hero), which does justice to the fact that he was acting as the hero in his elder years as well. Senior Malayalam cine actress Kaviyoor Ponnamma has revealed that Prem Nazir was a very good singer, and had training in Carnatic music.

1980s: Late career

By the beginning of the 1980s, Nazir himself moved into supporting roles. He mostly played supporting roles with the then super stars Jayan, Sukumaran, Shankar and Soman. In 1980, he acted in Ariyappedatha Rahasyam directed by P. Venu along with action hero Jayan. In 1981, he played a major supporting role in Mohan's Vida Parayum Munpe that earned him the Kerala State Special Jury Award. This shift, from a super romantic hero to character roles, gave him many powerful characters during the mid-1980s.His most iconic role till date came in the form of Padayottam released in 1982. Based loosely on the evergreen classic, The Count of Monte Cristo by Alexandre Dumas,Nazir played the titular role of Thamban,a prince who is cheated by his so called dear ones and friends and made a slave in a vessel. How he returns and hunts down those who were responsible for wrecking his life forms the crux of the story. The role has been lauded by many in the film fraternity who were amazed at the transformation of a hero who played romantic roles and the good samaritan to a machismo character who breathes revenge. He played his last hero role in Vellarikka Pattanam (1985) along with Ratheesh. Nevertheless the Padayottam was the biggest blockbuster at the time of its release running in packed theatres for one year and remained so for many years to come. It is also reputed the Nazir missed the National award for best actor by just one vote for his most famous iconic role that year. His second last film was Ayalvasi Oru Daridravasi(1986), where he starred with Mukesh, Shankar, Nedumudi Venu, Sukumari and Seema. His last completed film was A. T. Abu's Dhwani (1988), in which he co-starred with Jayaram. His last release was Priyadarshan's Kadathanadan Ambadi (1990), in which he co-starred with Mohanlal. In one of his last interviews, he had expressed a desire to direct a film with Mammootty and Mohanlal in the lead.

Popular film genres
Two popular film genres initiated by Prem Nazir are the C.I.D series and the Vadakkanpattu series. The former is a group of investigative films by P. Venu in which Nazir played James Bond like protagonists. In most of these movies Nazir teamed with Adoor Bhasi, a famed comedy actor who would accompany Nazir characters in investigations. These hit mainstream popularity with the trendsetter Lanka Dahanam and are perhaps the single most popular movie series in Malayalam film history. The waves created by this movie series continue in Malayalam cinema, arguably to this day. C.I.D. Nazir directed by P. Venu, has inspired numerous adaptations and similar series like for example popular CBI series with Mammootty in the lead and a satirical CID series of Mohanlal-Sreenivasan team. Other inspired films are C.I.D Unnikrishnan starring Jayaram and C.I.D Moosa with Dileep in the lead.

Another popular film series starring Nazir was a series of movies based on Vadakanpaattu which are part of the traditional folklore of Kerala. These are tales of martial warriors spread over generations through folk songs. Although the series may have been initiated by Sathyan's title role in Thacholi Othenan, the trend was continued long after his demise with Nazir in the lead, playing various other characters from Vadakkanpattu. Nazir later teamed with other actors like Jayan, Shankar, Mammootty, Jayaram and Mohanlal in later films of this category.

Personal life

Family
Prem Nazir was married to Habeeba Beevi and they have one son and three daughters. Laila (settled at Calicut), Rasiya (married to Mr. Hashim, Businessman from Kannur & settled at Chennai) – both elder to Shanavas. The youngest daughter is Rita (married to Doctor Sharafuddin of Punalur & settled at Muscat). Shanavas's wife Ayisha Beevi is the daughter of the eldest sister of Prem Nazir, Suleikha Beevi. Prem Nazir's son Shanavas acted in few films as well but could not succeed like his father. Third generation of Prem Nazir, Shanavas's son Shameer Khan, acted in a Malayalam film, Uppukandam Brothers Back in Action.

Prem Nazir's younger brother Prem Nawas (Abdul Wahab) also acted in a few films. Although he was the first in the family to begin acting in movies, he later began producing films – Agniputhri, Thulaavarsham, Poojakku Edukatha Pookkal, Neethi and Keni, to name a few. Prem Nawas's only son, Prem Kishore has also had a stint with the industry by acting in two Malayalam films – Vacation and Thaskaraputran. Prem Nawas has the distinction of acting in the first ever colour film made in Malayalam – Kandam Vechu Kottu.

Philanthropic work

Nazir is said to be a humanitarian and its still an ongoing debate as to whether he was greater as an actor or as a humanitarian though majority are of the opinion that he was a greater person as a humanitarian. This fact can be established by the phrase many of the old film veterans exclaimed that there will never be another Prem Nazir. He was arguably the only actor who treated his colleagues, well wishers and family with the same manner. Nazir had helped thousands of people in his life time. It is said that he never cared about the gratitude or ingratitude factor but just was happy that he could help some one. In fact it was not until after his death that his relatives, friends and well wishers realised his generosity when they met its beneficiaries. He was one of the very few who strove to make his close friend, Jayan a superstar. When Jayan succumbed to his injuries from his famed helicopter flight in Kolilakkam, it was Nazir who singlehandedly financed a flight from Chennai to bring his mortal remains back to Trivandrum. He also was responsible for recommending and giving chances to his film colleagues. Its reputed that he had a sharp memory and could immediately recognize someone instantly. He along with veteran director Sasikumar had helped many bankrupt producers who had pledged their assets to make films, regain their limelight. If any film he had acted failed to perform well he would immediately ask the producer to start the next film and that he would give his dates. Such was the generosity of Prem Nazir that his age had been truly termed as the golden age of Malayalam film where he elevated the film industry to another level by helping not only himself but everyone else in film industry attain growth. He donated an elephant in the Sarkara Devi Temple, Chirayinkil. Nazir also wrote a book on the film characters he played, Enne Thediyethiya Kathapatrangal. And his autobiographical book is Anubhvangal Oarmakal.Famous director and lyrist Sreekumarn Thambi wrote a book about his soulmate in the title Prem Nazir Enna Prema Ganam.

Death

It was during the late 1980s that Nazir, despite being a person with no political affiliations, campaigned rigorously for a running candidate in politics who happened to be a close friend of his. Due to his sincerity, dedication and tireless nature to help people in need, Nazir, who was a diabetic, failed to have proper food at times as he placed his mission much above his health. However all this took a toll on this and he became admitted to Vijaya hospital due to peptic ulcer which happens due to irregularity of having food. During that stint many of his fans had come to see him and since it was impossible in those days to contain a large following people just poured in to check the well being of their favorite actor. In that crowd it is said that there was a person who had measles and had freshly bathed which would increase the germs to spread. Nazir in his weak physique contracted it and this led his feeble condition to deteriorate further. Even though valiant attempts were made like trying to bring medicines from abroad to treat him, it all ended up in fiasco and the Nithya Haritha Nayakan died in the early hours of 16 January 1989, aged 62. His dead body was transported via aeroplane to Thiruvananthapuram, and via a special bus to his native land, where he was buried with full state honours.

Awards
Prem Nazir won his only Kerala State Film Award in 1981; He won Filmfare Special Award - South for numerous films in 1976 and he won a Special Jury Award for the supporting role he played in the film Vida Parayum Munbe. He was awarded the Padma Bhushan in 1983 by the President of India in recognition of distinguished services of a high order to the nation in his field (acting). The Prem Nazir Award was initiated in his memory, in 1992, for excellence in contributions to the Malayalam cinema Industry. He has also held the position of National Film Award jury in 1985.

Legacy and influence
Prem Nazir is known to be the most influential and trendsetting lead actor in Malayalam. He is known for his amazing longevity in that he was active during the peak years of other iconic Malayalam superstars like Sathyan and Jayan acting alongside them in 1960s and 1970s respectively. Nazir who began his movie career in the early 1950s, later acted alongside popular future stars like Shankar, Mammootty and Mohanlal by the 1980s. He was a mainstream superstar in Malayalam cinema for over 30 years from the late 1950s to late 1980s. He also has an unofficial recognition of playing a campus character while in his late fifties. Prem Nazir has the distinction of acting with the same heroine; Sheela, in over 100 films.

Nazir is generally considered the ultimate romantic hero in Malayalam cinema due to his handsomeness and ease of acting in romantic roles particularly in romantic song sequences. His song sequences combined with the lyrics of Vayalar, tunes of Devarajan and voice of K.J. Yesudas produced what is called the golden era of Malayalam film songs. Prem Nazir has also appeared in the highest number of dual roles (more than 40) in Indian films and perhaps in world cinema.

Filmography

Important roles

Films in which Nazir played dual roles

Prem Nazir holds the record of playing double roles in more than 40 films of his career. The first movie in which he had played a double role was the historical film, Kunjali Marakkar, directed by SS Rajan. The film won the National Film Award for Best Feature Film in Malayalam.

1 Kunjali Marakkar (1966) as Antonio/Narayanan Nair

2 Udhyogastha (1967)

3 Virunnukari (1969)

4 C.I.D. Nazir (1971)

5 Taxi Car (1972)

6 Thirichadi (1971) as Kuttappan/Venu

7 Rahasyam (1969) as Babu/K.K.Nair

8 Seemantha Puthran  (1978) as Surendran/Jayadevan

9 Makane Ninakku Vendi (1971) as Sam/Thomachan

10 Aromalunni (1974) as Kunjiraman/Aromalunni

11 Gandharvakshethram (1974) as Gandharvan/Velayudhan

12 Postmane Kananilla (1973) as Ramu/Aniyan

13 Football Champion (1976) as Vijayan/ Thakil Veerachami

14 Thenaruvi (1976) as Rajan/Mannaan.

15 Ragapournami (1978) as Vinayan/Ajayan

16 Thacholi Marumakan Chandu (1980) as Othenan/Kutty

17 Honeymoon (1974)

18 Mamangam (1980) as Marathandan/Kannan

19 Pathiravum Pakalvelichavum (1974)

20 Durga (1974) as Prof. Damodaran/Ramu

21 Kottaaram Vilkkaanundu (1975) as Murali

22 Picnic (1975) as Ravivarma/Rajagopal

23 Pichathikuttappan (1979)

24 Aaranyakaantam (1979) as Unnikrishnan/Duplicate Unni

25 Ariyappedatha Rahasyam (1981)

26 Kadamattathachan (1978) as Ravivarma/Kadamattathu Kathanar

27 Ajayanum Vijayanum (1978) as Ajayan/Vijayan

28 Paarijatham (1976)

29 Vanadevatha (1976) as Chandran/Suresh

30 Chennaaya Valarthiya Kutty (1976) as Sreeni/Maranchadi.

31 Kannappanunni (1981) as Durgadasan/Kannappanunni.

32 Kadathanaattu Maakkam (1978) as Nambeeshan/Kannan.

33 Kanalkattakal (1979) as Panikkar/Vijayan.

28 Aanappaachan (1978) as Paachan/Gopi.

29 Vijayanum Veeranum (1982) as Vijayan/Veeran.

30 Anthapuram (1981)

31 Sanchari (1981) as Sumesh/Suresh

32 Post Mortem (1982) as Vikariyachan/C.I.of Police.

33Marupacha (1982) as PremKumar, Premchandran

34 Ente Katha (1983) as Sreekumar/Sankar

35 Justice Raja (1983) as Justice Raja/Son of Raja.

36. Muhammadum musthafayum (1978) as Rajan/Babu

37. Rajurahim (1978) as Raju and Rahim

38. Mallanum Mathevanum

39. Anweshanam (1978) as Gopi/Venu

40. Adachangala (1978) as Ravi/Johnny

41. Ammini Ammavan (1977) as Anandhan/Suresh

Films in which Nazir played triple roles

 Ernakulam Junction (1971)
 Pushpanjali (1972)
 Amme Narayana (1984)

Other important films and characters

 Avakashi (1954)
 Murappennu (1965)
 Odeyil Ninnu (From the Gutter) – The 1966 film was based on the novel of the same name by P. Kesavadev.
 Iruttinte Athmavu (The Soul of Darkness) (1966) – Nazir played the mentally challenged Bhrantan Velayudhan in this film based on the classic novel by M. T. Vasudevan Nair.
 Nagarame Nandi [Thanks to the City] (1967)
 Nadhi (The River) (1969), Adimakal (1969), Kallichellamma (1969)
 Ningalenne Communistakki (You Made Me a Communist) – The 1970 film was based on the drama of the same name by Thoppil Bhasi.
 Thriveni (1970), Thurakkaatha Vaathil [The Door Never Opens] (1970)
 Anubhavangal Paalichakal (Experiences and Failures) (1971) – The story of persecutions and suffering of communists in the early days of modern Kerala. Nazir played one of the heroes alongside Sathyan.
 C.I.D. Nazir (1971) – A investigative series by P. Venu
 Vilakku Vangiya Veena (1971)
 Maaya (1972), Aaradi Manninte Janmi [The Landlord of 6 feet Earth] (1972)
 Pani Theeratha Veedu [The House never completes] (1973), Interview (1973)
 Achani (1973)
 Pathiravum Pakalvelichavum [Midnight & Daylight] (1974)
 Pravaham [Current] (1975)
 Seemantha Puthran [The First Son] (1976), Themmadi Velappan [Idiot Velappan] (1976), Amrithavaahini (1976)
 Vishukkani (1977), Randu Lokam (1977)
 Snehathinte Mukhangal [The Faces of Love] (1978)
 Asthamikkatha Pakalukal [The Days never Ends] (1981)
 Karipuranda Jeevithangal [500th Film Got Outstanding Performance Award] (1981)
 Vida Parayum Munpe (Before saying Goodbye) (1981) – Nazir received a special jury award for this film in the 1981 Kerala State Film Award.
 Padayottam (The Campaign) (1982) – Its story was inspired by Alexandre Dumas classic novel The Count of Monte Cristo and the treatment of the film was inspired by that of Ben-Hur.
 Ayalvasi Oru Daridravasi (Neighbour The Pauper!) (1986) – A comedy film by Priyadarshan, Nazir performed as a middle-aged father.
 Dhwani (The Sound) (1988) – This was his last completed film. The film was a hit due to several factors like the excellent performances by Prem Nazir, Jayaram, Shobhana, Suresh Gopi, Thilakan, and the everlasting music by maestro Naushad Ali.

References

External links

 
 Prem Nazeer at the MSI Movie Database
 Extensive reportage of Prem Nazir's death on Doordarshan (January 16, 1989)
 
 

Indian male film actors
Male actors from Thiruvananthapuram
1926 births
1989 deaths
Kerala State Film Award winners
Recipients of the Padma Bhushan in arts
Recipients of the Padma Shri in arts
Male actors in Malayalam cinema
20th-century Indian male actors